The Municipal Building of Texarkana, Arkansas, is located at Walnut and Third Streets in the downtown of the city.  It was built between 1927 and 1930 to a design by Witt, Seibert & Halsey, which has elements of the Collegiate Gothic and Art Deco styles.  The building houses a large auditorium in the center, with city offices in one wing and the main fire station in the other.  It also houses the city jail.  The building is located about three blocks from the state line with Texarkana, Texas.  The building was listed on the National Register of Historic Places in 2004.

See also
National Register of Historic Places listings in Miller County, Arkansas

References

City and town halls on the National Register of Historic Places in Arkansas
Gothic Revival architecture in Arkansas
Art Deco architecture in Arkansas
Government buildings completed in 1927
Buildings and structures in Texarkana, Arkansas
National Register of Historic Places in Miller County, Arkansas
1927 establishments in Arkansas